Omandur Ramasamy Reddiyar (1 February 1895 – 25 August 1970) was an Indian freedom-fighter and politician of the Indian National Congress. He served as the Premier of Madras Presidency from 23 March 1947 to 6 April 1949.

Early life

Omandur Ramaswamy Reddiyar was born on 1 February 1895 in the village of Omandur near Tindivanam in the  South Arcot district of Madras Presidency. He belonged to a Reddiar family. He had his schooling at Walter Scudder school and entered the Indian independence movement at an early age.

Ramaswamy Reddiyar was a devotee of Vallalar.

As Chief Minister

Ramaswamy Reddiyar became the Chief Minister or Premier of Madras on 23 March 1947 and was in power till 6 April 1949. During his tenure, the Madras Temple Entry Authorization Act 1947 was passed. This act was intended to give Dalits and other prohibited Hindus full and complete rights to enter Hindu temples. This was approved by the Governor on 11 May 1947 and passed as Madras Act 5 of 1947. The Devadasi Dedication Abolition Act of 1947 put an end to the devadasi system that was in vogue in many Hindu temples.

It was during his tenure that India achieved independence from the United Kingdom. Soon after independence and partition of India, there was a shortage of food grains, especially rice, in the province. In 1948, he ordered the purchase of a de Havilland Dove, the first aeroplane to be owned by the Government of Madras.

In 1948, when the Congress legislative party elections were held, Ramaswamy Reddiyar's candidature was opposed by Tanguturi Prakasam.  However, Reddiyar won with the support of K. Kamaraj. However, the Congress leaders were disgruntled with Reddiyar as he did not allow them special privileges. So, during the 1949 Congress Legislative Party elections, Kamaraj supported P. S. Kumaraswamy Raja against Ramaswamy Reddiyar. Though Ramaswamy Reddiyar was supported by C. Rajagopalachari, P. Subbarayan and T. Prakasam, he lost the vote and stepped down as Chief Minister.

Changes
Subbarayan resigned on 5 April 1948, Daniel Thomas on 15 June 1948 and Kala Venkata Rao on 24 January 1949.

Later years 
When his Premiership of Madras Presidency came to an end in April 1949, Ramaswamy Reddiyar was elected to the Constituent Assembly of India. The complex of buildings that houses the Tamil Nadu Legislative Assembly has been named after him.
A commemorative postage stamp on him was released on 25 August 2010.

Works

References

1895 births
1960 deaths
Telugu people
Chief Ministers of Tamil Nadu
Members of the Constituent Assembly of India
Chief ministers from Indian National Congress
Indian independence activists from Tamil Nadu